Sachin Balkrishna Nair (born 3 July 1978 in Pune, Maharashtra) is an Indian first-class cricketer. He is a left-handed lower order batsman and left arm fast medium bowler. He represents Maharashtra in the Ranji Trophy. Nair currently works as a trainer for schoolchildren, under various BCCI programs.

External links
 Sachin Nair in Cricinfo
 Sachin Balkrishna Nair

Indian cricketers
Maharashtra cricketers
Living people
1978 births